The Music - WWE - Volume 7 is a compilation album released by WWE. Unlike past WWE albums, this was released as a U.S. iTunes Store exclusive, although was eventually added to the UK and Canada iTunes music stores. It contains 21 tracks representing many genres of music.  It is not available at any other online retailer or any walk-in store.

Track listing
Starred tracks are not available as a separate download, and must be purchased as part of the album, Track 3 "Don't Waste My Time," had an alternate name as of April 1st it was called "New Breed."

See also

Music in professional wrestling

References

WWE albums
Rock compilation albums
Hip hop compilation albums
2007 compilation albums
ITunes-exclusive releases
2007 soundtrack albums